"Can't Forget Your Love/Perfect Crime: Single Edit" is a double A-side single by Japanese singer songwriter Mai Kuraki, taken from her second studio album Perfect Crime (2001) and third studio album Fairy Tale (2002). It was released on August 29, 2001, by Giza Studio, and both songs were served as the theme song to the Japanese television series . "Can't Forget Your Love" was written by Kuraki herself, Aika Ohno, Cybersound and Akihito Tokunaga, while "Perfect Crime: Single Edit" was written by Kuraki, Tokunaga, Daisuke Ikeda.

Commercial performance
Commercially, "Can't Forget Your Love/Perfect Crime: Single Edit" was a moderate success. Although the single instantly peaked at number two on the Oricon Weekly Singles Chart, it has managed to sold 180,040 copies as of February 2018, 30,000 copies fewer than her preceding single "Always". It spent eight weeks on the chart and became 113rd best-selling single of 2001 in Japan and has been certificated gold by Recording Industry Association of Japan (RIAJ).

Track listing

Credits and personnel
Credits and personnel adapted by the CD liner notes.

Mai Kuraki – vocals, background vocals, songwriting
Aika Ohno - songwriting
Akihito Tokunaga - songwriting, arrangement, backing vocals
Cybersound - arrangement
Daisuke Ikeda - string arrangement
Michael Africk - backing vocals

Maho Furukawa - backing vocals
Tama Music - strings
Mist a Sista - backing vocals
DJ Me-Ya - remix
Tokiko Nishimuro - director
KANONJI - producer

Charts

Weekly charts

Year-end charts

Certification and sales

|-
! scope="row"| Japan (RIAJ)
| Gold
| 180,040 
|-
|}

Release history

References

External links
Mai Kuraki Official Website

2001 singles
Mai Kuraki songs
Songs written by Aika Ohno
2001 songs
Songs written by Mai Kuraki
Song recordings produced by Daiko Nagato